Mālpils Municipality is a former municipality in Vidzeme, Latvia. The municipality was formed in 2009 by reorganization of Mālpils parish. The administrative centre was Mālpils.

On 1 July 2021, Mālpils Municipality ceased to exist and its territory was merged into Sigulda Municipality as Mālpils Parish.

See also 
 Administrative divisions of Latvia (2009)

References 

 
Former municipalities of Latvia